is a Japanese voice actress affiliated with the talent agency I'm Enterprise. She voices in a number of Japanese anime shows, with main characters Kōko Kaminaga in Riddle Story of Devil, Ema Yasuhara in Shirobako, and Nono Natsume in Urara Meirocho.

On December 31, 2019, she married Saitama Seibu Lions pitcher Shōgo Noda.

Biography

Filmography

Anime

Film

Video games

References

External links
  
  
 

Living people
1986 births
Voice actresses from Osaka Prefecture
Japanese video game actresses
Japanese voice actresses
21st-century Japanese actresses
I'm Enterprise voice actors